= Sha Kiu Tsuen =

Coordinates: 22.48815°N 113.999268°E

Sha Kiu Tsuen (Chinese: 沙橋村) is a village in Yuen Long District, New Territories, Hong Kong.
